The Prince's Manuscript is a 2000 Italian biographical drama film. It marked the feature film debut of Roberto Andò. It won the Nastro d'Argento for Best Production.

Cast 
Michel Bouquet as Giuseppe Tomasi di Lampedusa
Jeanne Moreau as Alexandra von Wolff-Stomersee 
Paolo Briguglia as  Marco Pace  
Giorgio Lupano as  Guido Lanza  
Leopoldo Trieste as  Lucio Piccolo 
Laurent Terzieff as old Marco Pace 
Sabrina Colle as  Anna Radice
Lucio Allocca as  Bebbuccio
Veronica Lazar as Lilja Iljascenko

References

External links

2000 films
Italian biographical drama films
Films directed by Roberto Andò
2000 biographical drama films
2000 drama films
Cultural depictions of Italian men
Giuseppe Tomasi di Lampedusa
2000s Italian films
Cultural depictions of writers